Under Cover Man is a 1932 American pre-Code crime film directed by James Flood and starring George Raft and Nancy Carroll.

Plot
Criminal Nick Darrow goes undercover to get the gangsters who killed his father. He teams up with Lora, the sister of Jimmy, a man who was killed by the same people.

Cast
 George Raft as Nick Darrow
 Nancy Carroll as Lora Madigan
 Lew Cody as Kenneth Mason
 Roscoe Karns as Dannie
 Noel Francis as Connie
 Gregory Ratoff as Martoff
 David Landau as Conklin
 Paul Porcasi as Sam Dorse
 Leyland Hodgson as Gillespie
 William Janney as Jimmy Madigan
 George Davis as Bernie
 Robert Homans as Flanagan

Production
The film was based on a novel by journalist John Wilstach which was published in 1931. The New York Times says "the book keeps pace with this morning's edition fairly well. Mr Wilstach merely blocks his crooks out in the rough. He lets action speak louder than style. There is a rather tarnished love interest. But the crookery is exciting."

Filming took place in October 1932. It was called "Raft's first important personal assignment."

It was the first time Raft played an undercover man. He would go on to play several more, even insisting scripts be changed so his character was an undercover man.

Reception
The Los Angeles Times called it "exciting and those who like this kind of entertainment will make no mistake to see it."

References

External links
 
Under Cover Man at TCMDB
Review of film at Variety

1932 films
1930s English-language films
American black-and-white films
1932 crime films
Paramount Pictures films
Films directed by James Flood
American crime films
Films with screenplays by Garrett Fort
Films based on novels
1930s American films
Films with screenplays by Francis Edward Faragoh